Alice Neel is a 2007 documentary film about the life of Alice Neel, exploring the struggles she faced as a woman artist, a single mother, and a painter who defied convention. The documentary was directed by Neel's grandson, Andrew Neel.

Alice Neel premiered at The Sundance Film Festival in 2007 and later won the Audience Award at the 2007 Newport Beach Film Festival later that year. The film was produced by SeeThink Productions.

External links 
 
 
 
 Interview with Andrew Neel in New York Magazine
 Reviews
 New York Times
 The Reeler
 TV Guide
 Time Out New York

2007 films
American documentary films
Documentary films about painters
SeeThink Films films
Films directed by Andrew Neel
2007 documentary films
2000s English-language films
2000s American films